Fleetwood Mac is a British-American rock band.

Fleetwood Mac may also refer to:
Fleetwood Mac (1968 album), also known as Peter Green's Fleetwood Mac, or the "Dog & Dustbin" album (from the album cover picture)
Fleetwood Mac (1975 album), also known as the White Album